Foreverland: On the Divine Tedium of Marriage is a 2022 memoir by Heather Havrilesky.

Reception
The book has four "positive" reviews, five "rave" reviews, and three "mixed" reviews, according to review aggregator Book Marks.

References

2022 non-fiction books
English-language books
Ecco Press books